Peucetia longipalpis is a species of lynx spider in the family Oxyopidae. It is found in a range from the United States to Venezuela.It was first described by Frederick Octavius Picard-Cambridge in the year 1902.

References

External links

 

Oxyopidae
Articles created by Qbugbot
Spiders described in 1902